Hasbro Interactive was an American video game production and publishing subsidiary of Hasbro, the large game and toy company. Several of its studios were closed in early 2001 and most of its properties were sold to Infogrames (now Atari SA) which completed its studio's closures at the end of 2001.

History 
Hasbro Interactive was formed late in 1995 in order to compete in the video game arena. Several Hasbro properties, such as Monopoly and Scrabble, had already been made into successful video games by licensees such as Virgin Interactive. With Hasbro's game experience, video games seemed like a natural extension of the company and a good opportunity for revenue growth. Hasbro Interactive's objective was to develop and publish games based on Hasbro properties.

In January 1997, the company announced they would publish games for the PlayStation.

Strong growth (1997–1999) 
In 1997, revenues increased 145% going from US$35 million to $86 million. Hasbro Interactive was growing so fast that there was talk of reaching $1 billion in revenues by 2002. and began to engage in some other video game licensing, such as licensing Frogger from Konami. They sought to use Hasbro board game brands and Wizards of the Coast properties as leverage to increase revenues.

Hasbro Interactive embarked on both internal and external development, and acquired some smaller video game developers and publishers along the way. On February 23, 1998, JTS sold the Atari brand name and interlecial properties of Atari Corporation to HIAC XI, Corp., a wholly owned subsidiary created in Delaware for the purpose of the purchase. Hasbro Interactive then renamed HIAC XI, Corp. as Atari Interactive, Inc. in May 1998 and would use the Atari brand name to publish retro-themed remake titles. On the 21st of that month, Hasbro announced that a remake of Centipede would be released for the PC and PlayStation. Throughout 1999 and 2000, games like The Next Tetris, Missile Command, Pong: The Next Level, Q*Bert, Glover, Nerf Arena Blast and Breakout would be released under the Atari branding.

On August 4, 1998, the company acquired the rights for 300 games when they purchased Avalon Hill for $6 million, and followed this up on August 14th by purchasing MicroProse for $70 million. With those acquisitions Hasbro Interactive revenues increased 127% in 1998 to $196 million and profits of $23 million. In July 1999, the company purchased UK-based educational software publisher Europress.

In 1998, Hasbro signed an agreement with Majesco Sales, whereas Majesco would publish/distribute games under a licensing agreement for various Nintendo consoles, notably the Game Boy Color. Majesco and Hasbro also worked on the Sega Dreamcast adaptation of Q*bert.

In April 1999, the company secured a licensing deal with Namco to develop and publish titles based on over 11 Namco franchises.

Losses and dot-com bubble burst (1999–2000) 
Hasbro Interactive became the number 3 video game publisher within three years of its founding. But in 1999, Hasbro Interactive lost $74 million on revenues of $237 million a growth of just 20% over the previous year. Late in 1999 with several game projects underway and dozens of new employees, many of whom moved just to work for the company, Hasbro Interactive shut down several studios in a cost-cutting move. The studios affected included the former MicroProse offices located in Alameda, California, and Chapel Hill, North Carolina. A game development company, Vicious Cycle Software, was started by employees laid off in the North Carolina Hasbro Interactive studio closing. In 4 years, Hasbro Interactive's revenue increased 577%.

By the middle of 2000, the dot-com bubble had burst, Hasbro share price had lost 70% of its value in just over a year and Hasbro would post a net loss the first time in two decades.

Sale to Infogrames (2000–2001) 
Faced with these difficulties, on December 6, 2000, Hasbro announced they would completely sell off their Hasbro Interactive division to French software company Infogrames. The sale included nearly all of their video game related rights and properties, the Atari brand and Hasbro's Games.com division, developer MicroProse and all of its software titles up to that point except for the Avalon Hill property. Hasbro Interactive's sale price was $100 million, $95 million as 4.5 million common shares of Infogrames and $5 million in cash. Under the terms of the sale agreement, Infogrames gained the rights to develop games based on Hasbro properties for a period of 15 years plus an option for an additional 5 years based on performance. The deal was completed on January 29, 2001, and Hasbro Interactive, Inc. was renamed as Infogrames Interactive, Inc. Majesco had ended its relationship with Hasbro once Infogrames took over the gaming company.

Aftermath 
In May 2003, the company merged with Atari Interactive, with the ex-Hasbro assets being renamed from Infogrames Interactive, Inc. to Atari Interactive, Inc., a wholly owned subsidiary of Infogrames Entertainment, SA (IESA). Infogrames (itself now known as Atari, SA) still maintains ownership of the original Atari properties received through Hasbro which are kept in their Hasbro Interactive-originated placeholder, Atari Interactive, Inc.

On June 9, 2005, Hasbro bought back the digital gaming rights for their properties from IESA for $65 million. Within the deal, Hasbro purchased back the video game rights to Transformers, My Little Pony, Tonka, Magic: The Gathering, Connect Four, Candy Land and Playskool, while obtaining a 10-year exclusive deal to produce video games based on Monopoly, Scrabble, Game of Life, Battleship, Clue, Yahtzee, Simon, Risk and Boggle, alongside an expanded separate deal with the Dungeons & Dragons franchise. This ten-year deal excluding D&D was soon shortened, as on August 10, 2007, Hasbro announced they had signed a new casual game deal with Electronic Arts.

Published games 

Hasbro Interactive published over 160 games on several interactive media. Included among them are:
 Action Man: Operation Extreme — PlayStation
 Avalon Hill's Diplomacy — Windows
 Axis & Allies — Windows
 B-17 Flying Fortress: The Mighty 8th — Windows
 Battleship: The Classic Naval Warfare Game — Windows
 Battleship: Surface Thunder — Windows
 Beast Wars: Transformers — PlayStation, Windows, Macintosh
 Boggle — Windows
 CatDog: Quest for the Golden Hydrant — Windows
 Centipede — Windows
 Civilization II: Test of Time — Windows
 Clue — Windows
 Daytona USA 2001 — Dreamcast
 Falcon 4.0 — Windows
 Frogger — Windows, PlayStation
 Frogger 2: Swampy's Revenge — Windows, PlayStation, Dreamcast
 Galaga: Destination Earth — Windows, PlayStation, Game Boy Color
 Game of Life — Windows
 Glover — Nintendo 64, Windows, PlayStation
 Grand Prix 3 — Windows
 Grand Prix World - Windows
 Grand Prix World 2 - Windows
 Gunship! — Windows
 H.E.D.Z. — Windows
 Majesty: The Fantasy Kingdom Sim — Windows
 MechWarrior 3 — Windows
 Jeopardy! — PlayStation, Windows
 Monopoly (1995) - Windows
 Monopoly (1997) — PlayStation
 Monopoly Star Wars — Windows
 Monopoly (1999) — Nintendo 64
 Monopoly (1999) — Windows
 NASCAR Heat — Windows, PlayStation, Game Boy Color
 NASCAR Racers — Windows, Game Boy Color
 Nerf Arena Blast — Windows
 Nerf Jr. Foam Blaster: Attack of the Kleptons! — Windows
 Nicktoons Racing — Windows, PlayStation, Game Boy Color
 Pac-Man: Adventures in Time — Windows
 Pong: The Next Level — Windows, PlayStation
 Q*bert — Windows, PlayStation, Dreamcast, Game Boy Color
 Risk — Windows
 Risk II — Windows
 RollerCoaster Tycoon — Windows
 Rubik's Games — Windows
 Scrabble — Windows (MacScrabble — Macintosh)
 Sorry! — Windows
 Spirit of Speed 1937 — Windows
 Star Trek: Birth of the Federation — Windows
 Trivial Pursuit Millennium — Windows
 Wheel of Fortune — PlayStation, Windows
 Worms Armageddon — Windows, Dreamcast, PlayStation
 X-COM: Enforcer — Windows
 Yahtzee — Windows

References

External links 
 Hasbro Interactive History at MobyGames
 Hasbro Interactive  by William Achtmeyer from Tuck School of Business (PDF)

1995 establishments in Massachusetts
2001 disestablishments in Massachusetts
Companies based in Beverly, Massachusetts
Former Hasbro subsidiaries
Defunct video game companies of the United States
Video game companies established in 1995
Video game companies disestablished in 2001
American companies established in 1995
American companies disestablished in 2001